SIIMA Lifetime Achievement Award is an award presented by Vibri media group as part of its annual South Indian International Movie Awards for the person who contributed much to the film industry. It was instituted in 2012, with Ambareesh being the first recipient.

Recipients

References 

South Indian International Movie Awards
Lifetime achievement awards